The politics of Shandong Province in the People's Republic of China is structured in a dual party-government system like all other governing institutions in mainland China.

The Governor of Shandong is the highest-ranking official in the People's Government of Shandong. However, in the province's dual party-government governing system, the Governor has less power than the Shandong Chinese Communist Party (CCP) Provincial Committee Secretary, colloquially termed the "Shandong CCP Party Chief".

List of the CCP Shandong Provincial Committee secretaries 
Kang Sheng: 1949
Fu Qiutao: 1949–1950
Xiang Ming: 1950–1954
Shu Tong: 1954–1960
Zeng Xisheng: 1960–1961
Tan Qilong: 1961–1967
Wang Xiaoyu: 1969
Yang Dezhi: 1971–1974
Bai Rubing: 1974–1982
Su Yiran: 1982–1985
Liang Buting: 1985–1988
Jiang Chunyun: 1988–1994
Zhao Zhihao: 1994–1997
Wu Guanzheng: 1997–2002
Zhang Gaoli: 2002–2007
Li Jianguo: 2007–2008
Jiang Yikang: 2008–2017
Liu Jiayi: 2017–2021
Li Ganjie(李干杰): 2021-present

List of governors of Shandong

Kang Sheng: 1949–1955
Zhao Jianmin: 1955–1958
Tan Qilong: 1958–1963
Bai Rubing: 1963–1967
Wang Xiaoyu: 1967–1969
Yang Dezhi: 1971–1974
Bai Rubing: 1974–1979
Su Yiran: 1979–1982
Liang Buting: 1982–1985
Li Chang'an: 1985–1987
Jiang Chunyun: 1987–1989
Zhao Zhihao: 1989–1995
Li Chunting: 1995–2001
Zhang Gaoli: 2001–2003
Han Yuqun: 2003–2007
Jiang Daming: 2007–2013
Guo Shuqing: 2013–2017
Gong Zheng: 2017–2020
Li Ganjie (李干杰): 2020-2021
Zhou Naixiang (周乃翔): 2021-present

List of chairmen of Shandong Provincial People's Congress 
Zhao Lin: 1979–1983
Qin Hezhen: 1983–1985
Li Zhen: 1985–1996
Zhao Zhihao: 1996–2002
Han Xikai: 2002–2003
Zhang Gaoli: 2003–2007
Li Jianguo: 2007–2008
Jiang Yikang: 2008–2017
Liu Jiayi: 2017–2021
Li Ganjie(李干杰): 2021-present

List of chairmen of the CPPCC Shandong Provincial Committee 
 Tan Qilong: 1955–1967
 Bai Rubing: 1977–1979
 Gao Keting: 1979–1983
 Li Zichao: 1983–1993
 Lu Maozeng: 1993–1998
 Han Xikai: 1998–2002
 Wu Aiying: 2002–2004
 Sun Shuyi: 2004–2009
 Liu Wei: 2009–2018
 Fu Zhifang (付志方): 2018-2022
 Ge Huijun (葛慧君): 2022-present

Shandong
Shandong